Anolis antioquiae, the Antiodlula anole or Antioquia anole, is a species of lizard in the family Dactyloidae. The species is found in Colombia.

References

Anoles
Reptiles of Colombia
Endemic fauna of Colombia
Reptiles described in 1985
Taxa named by Ernest Edward Williams